John Baptist Morris (June 29, 1866 – October 22, 1946) was an American prelate of the Roman Catholic Church. He served as bishop of the Diocese of Little Rock in Arkansas from 1907 until his death.

Biography

Early life 
John Morris was born in Hendersonville, Tennessee, to John and Anne (née Morrissey) Morris, both Irish immigrants. After graduating from St. Mary's College in Lebanon, Kentucky, he began his studies for the priesthood in 1887 at the Pontifical North American College in Rome.

Priesthood 
While in Rome, Morris was ordained a priest for the Diocese of Nashville by Cardinal Lucido Parocchi on June 11, 1892. Following his return to Tennessee, Morris was named rector of St. Mary's Cathedral in Nashville and private secretary to Bishop Thomas Byrne. In 1901, Morris became vicar general of the diocese. He was raised to the rank of a domestic prelate in 1905.

Coadjutor Bishop and Bishop of Little Rock 
On April 18, 1906, Morris was appointed coadjutor bishop of the Diocese of Little Rock, and Titular Bishop of Acmonia by Pope Pius X. He received his episcopal consecration on  June 11, 1906, from Bishop Byrne, with Bishops Edward Allen and Nicholas Gallagher serving as co-consecrators, at St. Mary's Cathedral. He was the first native Tennessean to be elevated to the Catholic episcopacy. Upon the death of Bishop Edward Fitzgerald on February 21, 1907, Morris automatically succeeded him as the third bishop of Little Rock.

Morris opened Little Rock College for Boys in 1908 at a cost of $50,000; he also opened St. Joseph's Orphanage, which was completed at a cost of $150,000 and placed under the care of the Benedictine Sisters, in 1910. He presided over the first diocesan synod in February 1909, and established the first school for Catholic teachers during the following June. In 1911, Morris founded St. John Home Missions Seminary; he considered it as his greatest accomplishment. That same year, he established the diocesan newspaper, The Southern Guardian. He erected separate parishes for African Americans in El Dorado, Fort Smith, Helena, Hot Springs, Lake Village, Little Rock, North Little Rock, and Pine Bluff; Morris also opened an African-American orphanage at Pine Bluff. He founded a school for boys near Searcy under the care of Poor Brothers of St. Francis, as well as a school for delinquent girls run by the Good Shepherd Sisters in Hot Springs.

Morris was confronted with a resurgence of anti-Catholicism early in his tenure, and during World War I many German American Catholics and German-speaking priests in Arkansas found themselves under suspicion. Morris, who was strongly patriotic and sold bonds during the war, helped mitigate such bigotry through his friendship with Arkansas Governor Joseph  Robinson. Despite the financial hardships of the Great Depression, Morris raised $20,000 to purchase an organ for the St. Andrew's Cathedral. Morris opened Catholic High School for Boys in 1930, and was named an assistant at the pontifical throne the following year. He publicly condemned anti-Semitism following the Kristallnacht attacks in Germany in November 1938.

Death and legacy 
Morris died at the rectory of St. Andrew's Cathedral in Little Rock on October 22, 1946, at age 80. He is buried in the crypt under the Cathedral. During his tenure, Morris increased the number of priests from 60 to 154, and the number of schools from 29 to 80; by 1940, the diocese contained over 33,000 Catholics and 125 churches.

References

1866 births
1946 deaths
People from Hendersonville, Tennessee
American people of Irish descent
Roman Catholic bishops of Little Rock
20th-century Roman Catholic bishops in the United States
St. Mary's College (Kentucky) alumni
Pontifical North American College alumni
Catholics from Tennessee